Missa Sanctissimae Trinitatis (Mass of the Holiest Trinity) in A minor, ZWV 17, is the a vocal-instrumental sacred work, written by Czech Baroque composer Jan Dismas Zelenka. It was completed in 1736 as the first of five high masses he wrote in the last ten years of his life.

Description
Missa Santissimae Trinitis is the composition of combined sacred style, which not only divides the liturgy text only according to the conventional Kyrie, Gloria, Credo, Sanctus and Agnus Dei, but also into shorter parts which form independent musical movements. In each of them the instrumental grouping, character and style differ. Old and modern techniques are joined, therefore, not only in the sense of changing the individual movements, but they also penetrate each other within.

The mass is divided into 19 individual movements. Above all, the choruses reveal the strong influence of contemporary opera and concerto, and solo arias. The solo arias (in Part II, alto, in VI and XV, soprano) are much more extensive than other Zelenka's mass arias of the 1720s. They are introduced by virtuoso ritornellos. Orchestral parts are independent and rich with melodiously flowing solo voices. Similarly, the concertante choruses (Parts IV, IX and XI) are represented with modern ritornellos. The orchestra parts in these movements also are independent and often dominate over the simple homophonic chorus. The influence of the concerto structure is revealed in the contrast between solo vocal and choral parts. The opposite pole of the chorus concerto are the massive choral fugues - their dialogue here not only demonstrate the composer's technical mastery, but also illustrate the intellectual depth and significance of the work.

Orchestration
As with Zelenka's other High Mass compositions there are no brasses in the orchestration, which includes only organ, six violins, two viols, cello, double bass, two oboes, bassoon and archlute, expanded by two solo flutes and a chalumeau.

Structure 

 Kyrie
 I Kyrie eleison I (Coro)
 II Christe eleison (Aria, Alto solo)
 III Kyrie eleison II (Coro - Fuga)

 Gloria
 IV Gloria in excelsis Deo (Coro e soli SATB)
 V Qui tollis peccata mundi (Coro)
 VI Quoniam tu solus Sanctus (Aria, Soprano solo)
 VII Cum sancto Spiritu I (Coro)
 VIII Cum sancto Spiritu II (Coro - Fuga) 

 Credo
 IX Credo in unum Deum (Coro e soli SATB)
 X Et incarnatus est (Coro)
 XI Et resurrexit (Coro e solo Tenore)
 XII Et unam sanctam...Ecclesiam (Soli - SAT)
 XIII Et vitam venturi saeculi (Coro - Fuga)

 Sanctus
 XIV Sanctus (Coro)
 XV Benedictus (Aria, Soprano solo)
 XVI Osanna in excelsis (Coro)

 Agnus Dei
XVII. Agnus Dei I (Soli: Tenore e Basso)
XVIII. Agnus Dei II (Coro)
XIX. Dona nobis pacem (Coro - Fuga)

Recordings 
 Missa Sanctissimae Trinitatis by Musica Florea, CD, Studio Matouš, 1994
 Missa Sanctissimae Trinitatis ZWV 17, Gaude laetare ZWV 168 by Ensemble Inégal, Prague Baroque Soloists (Adam Viktora), CD, Nibiru, 2012

Missa Santissimae Trinitatis
1736 compositions